The 2003 Czech Republic motorcycle Grand Prix was the tenth round of the 2003 MotoGP Championship. It took place on the weekend of 15–17 August 2003 at the Masaryk Circuit located in Brno, Czech Republic.

Chris Burns, riding a ROC Yamaha, would become the last rider to start a race in Grand Prix motorcycle racing's premier class with a 2-stroke 500cc bike. His teammate, José David de Gea, also entered the race riding the Sabre V4 500cc bike, but he did not take the start.

MotoGP classification

250 cc classification

125 cc classification

Championship standings after the race (motoGP)

Below are the standings for the top five riders and constructors after round ten has concluded.

Riders' Championship standings

Constructors' Championship standings

 Note: Only the top five positions are included for both sets of standings.

References

Czech Republic motorcycle Grand Prix
Czech Republic
Motorcycle Grand Prix